The election for the Hong Kong deputies to the 10th National People's Congress (NPC) was held on 3 December 2002. 36 Hong Kong deputies were elected by an electoral college.

Background
Article 21 of the Hong Kong Basic Law stipulates:

Chinese citizens who are residents of the Hong Kong Special Administrative Region shall be entitled to participate in the management of state affairs according to law.

In accordance with the assigned number of seats and the selection method specified by the National People's Congress, the Chinese citizens among the residents of the Hong Kong Special Administrative Region shall locally elect deputies of the Region to the National People's Congress to participate in the work of the highest organ of state power.

An electoral college composed of the following:
 Members of the previous electoral college that had elected the Hong Kong deputies to the 9th National People's Congress;
 Hong Kong delegates of the 9th Chinese People's Political Consultative Committee (CPPCC);
 Members of the Election Committee (which elects the Chief Executive) who are Chinese nationals, except those who opt out; and
 The Chief Executive of the HKSAR.

Election result
54 of the 78 candidates were pre-elected on 29 November 2002 and 36 of the 54 candidates were elected on 3 December. It was presided by Tung Chee-hwa, executive chairman of the 15-strong presidium. Five pro-democrats who contested in the election, Albert Ho, James To, Sin Chung-kai, Anthony Cheung and Frederick Fung were defeated in the heavily pro-Beijing electoral college. The Liaison Office was accused of issuing a recommendation list to the electors before the election.

Elected members (36)

 Robin Chan
 Cheng Yiu-tong
 David Chu Yu-lin
 Rita Fan Hsu Lai-tai
 Fei Fih
 Ip Kwok-him
 Kan Fook-yee
 Ko Po-ling
 Lam Kwong-siu
 Priscilla Lau Pui-king
 Joseph Lee Chung-tak
 Allen Lee Peng-fei
 Lee Chark-tim
 Lee Lin-sang
 Sophie Leung Lau Yau-fun
 Lo Suk-ching
 Ma Fung-kwok
 Ma Lik
 Ng Ching-fai
 Ng Hong-mun
 Ng Leung-sing
 Sik Chi-wai
 Victor Sit Fung-shuen
 Maria Tam Wai-chu
 Tsang Hin-chi
 Tsang Tak-sing
 Tso Wung-wai
 Wang Rudeng
 Carson Wen Ka-shuen
 Wong Kwok-kin
 Peter Wong Man-kong
 Philip Wong Yu-hong
 Wilfred Wong Ying-wai
 Raymond Wu Wai-yung
 Yeung Yiu-chung
 Yuen Mo

Supplementary members (16)

 Peter Chan Chi-kwan
 Raymond Chien Kuo-fung
 David Fang
 Fung Chi-kin
 Raymond Ho Chung-tai
 Bernard Hui Man-bock
 Stanley Ko Kam-chuen
 Dennis Lam Shun-chiu
 Leung Ping-chung
 Lo Chung-hing
 Ma Ho-fai
 Ngai Shiu-kit
 Wong Po-yan
 Wong Siu-yee
 Wong Yuk-shan
 Howard Young

Controversies
The Liaison Office was criticised for meddling in the election; it was accused of issuing a recommendation list to the electors before the election. James Tien of the Liberal Party criticised the Liaison Office for circulating the recommendation lists, the Democratic Party's Martin Lee viewed it as a "shadow government" meddling in elections in all levels, including the Chief Executive elections, coordinating with pro-Beijing parties in Legislative Council and District Council elections,.

References

2002 elections in China
2002 in Hong Kong
NPC
December 2002 events in Africa